Now It's Overhead is the debut album by the band Now It's Overhead from Athens, Georgia. It was released on October 2, 2001.
This was Saddle Creek Records'  first full-length album by a band from outside of Nebraska. The band consisted of Andy LeMaster (vocals, instruments, recording), Orenda Fink (bass, keyboards, trumpet, vocals), Maria Taylor (keyboards, vocals), and Clay Leverett (drums, vocals).

Andy LeMaster, former Sugar bassist David Barbe, and  Glands bassist Andy Baker jointly own and operate Chase Park Transduction Recording Studio in Athens. Along with the Now It's Overhead recording, Chase Park has also made recordings by Japancakes, Azure Ray, Seaworthy, Amy Ray, and The Glands.

Track listing

References

2001 debut albums
Now It's Overhead albums
Saddle Creek Records albums
Albums produced by Andy LeMaster